Sebastian Paul Brock, FBA (born 1938, London) is a British scholar, university professor, and expert in the field of academic studies of Classical Syriac language and Classical Syriac literature. His research also encompasses various aspects of cultural history of Syriac Christianity. He is generally acknowledged as one of the foremost academics in the field of Syriac studies, and one of the most prominent scholars in the wider field of Aramaic studies.

Brock studied at Eton College, and completed his BA degree in Classics and Oriental Languages (Hebrew and Aramaic) at Trinity College (University of Cambridge). In 1966, he became Doctor of Philosophy at Oxford. He was Assistant Lecturer, and then Lecturer, at the University of Birmingham (Department of Theology) from 1964 to 1967. He continued his academic career as Lecturer in Hebrew, and then Lecturer in Hebrew and Aramaic, at Cambridge University, from 1967 to 1974. He was Lecturer in Aramaic and Syriac, and then Reader in Syriac Studies, at the University of Oxford's Oriental Institute, from 1974 to 2003. Since 2003, he is Emeritus Reader in Syriac Studies and Emeritus Fellow of Wolfson College, Oxford.

Brock is a Fellow of the British Academy. He is the recipient of a number of honorary doctorates, holding the PhD Honoris Causa at École pratique des hautes études in Paris. Brock has been awarded the Medal of Saint Ephrem the Syrian by the Syriac Orthodox Patriarch of Antioch, and the Leverhulme Medal of the British Academy (2009). He is a widely published author on Syriac topics.

Brock is married to Helen Hughes-Brock, an archaeologist specialising in Minoan Crete and Mycenaean Greece. He is a patron of the Fellowship of Saint Alban and Saint Sergius.

References

Sources

External links 
 Sebastian Brock's faculty page at the Oriental Institute, Oxford.
 Syri.ac - Sebastian Brock: CV and Publications (June 2018)
 The Future of Syriac Studies and the Legacy of Sebastian P. Brock (2018)

Syriacists
Patristic scholars
Fellows of Wolfson College, Oxford
Fellows of the British Academy
Living people
1938 births
Alumni of the University of Oxford
Recipients of the Order of Sankt Ignatios